This is an incomplete list of football clubs which have won four or more trophies in a single season.

In a football season, clubs typically compete in a number of domestic competitions, such as a league and one or more cup competitions, as well as sometimes in continental competitions. Winning multiple competitions is seen as a particularly significant achievement. Doubles and trebles are usually long-remembered achievements, but do occur with some level of frequency, whereas winning four or more trophies in one season is much rarer. In the 2010s, the terms quadruple, quintuple and sextuple have sometimes been used to refer to winning four, five and six trophies in a single season.

This list is limited to clubs playing in the top division of their league system.

Four titles in one season 
Some clubs have won four competitions in a single season. This has sometimes been called a 'quadruple'. Other teams have won four competitions in a calendar year, though not all in the same season.

Men

Women

Five titles in one season 
Other teams have won five competitions in a calendar year, though not all in the same season.

Men

Six titles in a season 
Other teams have won six competitions in a calendar year, though not all in the same season.

Men

Women

Seven titles in a season 
Other teams have won seven competitions in a calendar year, though not all in the same season.

Men

References 

Association football records and statistics